"Be Quick or Be Dead" is a song by English heavy metal band Iron Maiden, released as the first single from their ninth studio album, Fear of the Dark, on 13 April 1992. The single peaked at  2 on the UK Singles Chart and in Finland while reaching the top 10 in Denmark, Ireland, and Norway.

Synopsis
The song is about several political scandals taking place at the time of its release, including the Robert Maxwell banking scandal, European stock market crashes, and the BCCI case. It was released a month prior to the album and reached No. 2 on the UK Singles Chart. The song is faster and heavier than most Iron Maiden songs, and is the band's first single co-written by Janick Gers.

The B-side features two official songs and one hidden track, including an original blues number ("Nodding Donkey Blues") and Montrose cover ("Space Station No. 5"), and the unlisted "Bayswater Ain't a Bad Place to Be". The last is a spoken word comedy piece by Bruce Dickinson (along with acoustic guitar accompaniment from Janick Gers) in which he imitates and makes fun of Maiden manager Rod Smallwood. A similar mockery of Smallwood was released before, as a B-side titled "Sheriff of Huddersfield", which was available on the "Wasted Years" single.

Track listings
7-inch single

12-inch single

UK 12-inch single

CD single

UK CD single

French CD maxi-single

Personnel
Production credits are adapted from the 7 inch single and picture disc covers.

Iron Maiden
 Bruce Dickinson – lead vocals
 Dave Murray – guitar
 Janick Gers – guitar
 Steve Harris – bass guitar, producer
 Nicko McBrain – drums

Production
 Martin Birch – producer
 Derek Riggs – sleeve illustration
 Mike Prior – photography
 George Chin – photography

Charts

References

Iron Maiden songs
1992 songs
1992 singles
EMI Records singles
Song recordings produced by Martin Birch
Songs written by Bruce Dickinson
Songs written by Janick Gers